Oskar Wilhelm Traugott Näumann (3 July 1876 – 8 March 1937) was a German gymnast. He competed in the men's individual all-around event at the 1900 Summer Olympics.

References

External links

1876 births
1937 deaths
German male artistic gymnasts
Olympic gymnasts of Germany
Gymnasts at the 1900 Summer Olympics
Gymnasts from Berlin